In 1965, the United States FBI, under Director J. Edgar Hoover, continued for a sixteenth year to maintain a public list of the people it regarded as the Ten Most Wanted Fugitives.

As the year 1965 began, eight of the ten places on the list remained filled by these elusive long-time fugitives from prior years, then still at large:

 1956 #97 (nine years), Eugene Francis Newman process dismissed June 11, 1965
 1960 #137 (five years), Donald Leroy Payne process dismissed November 26, 1965
 1962 #170 (three years), Edward Howard Maps remained still at large
 1963 #175 (two years), Harold Thomas O'Brien process dismissed January 14, 1965
 1964 #192 (one year), George Patrick McLaughlin arrested February 24, 1965
 1964 #193 (one year), Chester Collins remained still at large
 1964 #197 (one year), Alson Thomas Wahrlich remained still at large
 1964 #199 (six months), William Hutton Coble arrested March 1, 1965

By year end, three of the longest listed Fugitives had been removed.  With so many new openings on the list facing them throughout 1965, the FBI again had a very productive year of new captures, and added a total of an additional twenty-one new Fugitives, at a rate of nearly two per month.

1965 is also notable for the first-time inclusion of two brothers together, Samuel Jefferson Veney and Earl Veney.

1965 fugitives
The "Ten Most Wanted Fugitives" listed by the FBI in 1965 include (in FBI list appearance sequence order):

John William Clouser
January 7, 1965 #203
Seven years on the list
John William Clouser - PROCESS DISMISSED August 1, 1972 in Montgomery, Alabama

Walter Lee Parman
January 15, 1965 #204
Two weeks on the list
Walter Lee Parman - U.S. prisoner arrested January 31, 1965 in Los Angeles, California after a citizen recognized him
from a newspaper article

Gene Thomas Webb
February 11, 1965 #205
One day on the list
Gene Thomas Webb - U.S. prisoner arrested February 12, 1965 in Chicago, Illinois after he was recognized by FBI Agents as
he walked along a road in Colonial Village

Samuel Jefferson Veney
February 25, 1965 #206
Three weeks on the list
Samuel Jefferson Veney - U.S. prisoner arrested March 11, 1965 in Garden City, New York with his brother, Earl Veney (Fugitive #207) by the FBI and Federal Narcotics Agents. Both men were working as machine operators in a manufacturing plant. A citizen cooperating with Federal Narcotics recognized Veney.

Earl Veney
March 5, 1965 #207
One week on the list
Earl Veney - U.S. prisoner arrested March 11, 1965 in Garden City, New York with his brother, Samuel Veney (Fugitive #206).  Earl had been listed by the FBI two weeks after his brother.

Donald Stewart Heien
March 11, 1965 #208
One year on the list
Donald Stewart Heien - U.S. prisoner arrested February 3, 1966 in Newton Center, Massachusetts by the FBI after a citizen recognized him from media coverage

Arthur Pierce, Jr.
March 24, 1965 #209
One day on the list
Arthur Pierce, Jr. - U.S. prisoner arrested March 25, 1965 in Spring Valley, New York after a citizen recognized him
from a newspaper article. He had been working as a painting contractor.

Donald Dean Rainey

March 26, 1965 #210

Three months on the list

Donald Dean Rainey - U.S. prisoner arrested June 20, 1965 in Nogales, Arizona

Leslie Douglas Ashley

April 6, 1965 #211

Two weeks on the list

Leslie Douglas Ashley - U.S. prisoner arrested April 23, 1965 in Atlanta, Georgia while he was working in a carnival side show

Charles Bryan Harris
May 6, 1965 #212
One month on the list
Charles Bryan Harris - U.S. prisoner apprehended June 17, 1965 near Fairfield, Illinois, living in an old farm house

William Albert Autur Tahl
June 10, 1965 #213
Five months on the list
William Albert Autur Tahl - U.S. prisoner arrested November 5, 1965 in St. Louis, Missouri by local authorities

Duane Earl Pope
June 11, 1965 #214
One day on the list
Duane Earl Pope - U.S. prisoner surrendered June 11, 1965 to local police in Kansas City, Missouri shortly after he was
added to the "Top Ten" list

Allen Wade Haugsted
June 24, 1965 #215
Six months on the list
Allen Wade Haugsted - U.S. prisoner arrested December 23, 1965 in Houston, Texas after a citizen recognized him from a
photo in the Houston Chronicle newspaper. He was working as a baker in a suburban shopping center.

Theodore Matthew Brechtel
June 30, 1965 #216
Two months on the list
Theodore Matthew Brechtel - U.S. prisoner arrested August 16, 1965 in Chicago, Illinois at his place of employment where he was working as a painter. Although he had been using an alias, he admitted his true identity to arresting Agents stating, "I know what you want. I'm it."

Robert Allen Woodford
July 2, 1965 #217
One month on the list
Robert Allen Woodford - U.S. prisoner arrested August 5, 1965 in Seattle, Washington by the FBI after a citizen recognized him from a wanted flyer

Warren Cleveland Osborne
August 12, 1965 #218
One month on the list
Warren Cleveland Osborne - KILLED in a wreck from a high speed car chase September 9, 1965 near Mount Washington, Kentucky by local police, and was positively identified
through fingerprints

Holice Paul Black
August 25, 1965 #219
Four months on the list
Holice Paul Black - U.S. prisoner arrested December 15, 1965 in Miami, Florida

Edward Owen Watkins
September 21, 1965 #220
One year on the list
Edward Owen Watkins - U.S. prisoner arrested December 2, 1966 in Florence, Montana. FBI Agents displayed photos of
Watkins to stores selling western clothing and a salesman recognized him.

Joel Singer
November 19, 1965 #221
Two weeks on the list
Joel Singer - Canadian prisoner apprehended December 1, 1965 in Montreal, Quebec, Canada by Montreal police. He
had been the object of an intensive joint investigation by the FBI and Canadian authorities.

James Edward Kennedy
December 8, 1965 #222
Two weeks on the list
James Edward Kennedy - U.S. prisoner arrested December 23, 1965 in Worcester, Massachusetts after a citizen recognized
him from a newspaper article

Lawrence John Higgins
December 14, 1965 #223
Two weeks on the list
Lawrence John Higgins - U.S. prisoner arrested January 3, 1966 in Emigrant Gap, California by the California Highway Patrol

See also

Later entries
FBI Ten Most Wanted Fugitives, 2020s
FBI Ten Most Wanted Fugitives, 2010s
FBI Ten Most Wanted Fugitives, 2000s
FBI Ten Most Wanted Fugitives, 1990s
FBI Ten Most Wanted Fugitives, 1980s
FBI Ten Most Wanted Fugitives, 1970s
FBI Ten Most Wanted Fugitives, 1960s

Prior entries
FBI Ten Most Wanted Fugitives, 1950s

References

External links
Current FBI top ten most wanted fugitives at FBI site
FBI pdf source document listing all Ten Most Wanted year by year (removed by FBI)

1965 in the United States